The women's 87 kg competition at the 2019 World Weightlifting Championships was held from 24 to 26 September 2019.

Schedule

Medalists

Records

Results

References

Results 

Women's 87 kg
2019 in women's weightlifting